Delacroix is a crater on Mercury. Its name was adopted by the International Astronomical Union in 1979. Delacroix is named for the French painter Eugène Delacroix, who lived from 1798 to 1863.

Delacroix overlies the slightly larger and older crater Shelley, to the south.

References

Impact craters on Mercury